Eclipse (stylized as ECL1P53) is the fourteenth studio album by American rock band Journey and the second with lead singer Arnel Pineda. Penned by Neal Schon and Jonathan Cain with contributions from Pineda, the album was released in the United States and Canada on May 24, 2011, on May 27, 2011, in Japan, in the United Kingdom on May 30, 2011, and internationally on June 3, 2011. It is the last album to feature bassist Ross Valory, who was dismissed from the group in 2020.

Production
Eclipse was recorded in Berkeley, CA.  As the album was near completion, producer Kevin Shirley ran out of time.  In an effort for the band to release the album in time for the tour, Neal Schon and Jonathan Cain produced the remaining tracks in Nashville.  The album was a departure, focusing on a harder rock sound rather than the formulaic pop hits and ballads.  Schon, feeling the pop formula became repetitive, wanted to experiment on Eclipse and make it more guitar-oriented and less radio-friendly.  Shirley had trepidation about the direction of the album, clashing with Schon creatively.  Many of the tracks were re-recorded in Nashville under Schon and Cain's production.  Cain supported Eclipse, saying "we’d had this concept in mind from the get go. We’ve got the ballads we can play all day long. If people want to hear ballads, they can certainly find them on other records."

Despite this intentional change in sound, it does feature at least one ballad in the form of Anything is Possible, which hit number twenty-one on the Billboard Adult Contemporary chart.

Release and reception
Eclipse was released on May 24, 2011.  In North America it was exclusively sold at Wal-Mart.  Eclipse sold 21,400 copies in the United States in its debut week, reaching No. 13 on the US Billboard 200 chart. Eclipse marks Journey's second straight Top 20 album with current lead singer, Arnel Pineda.  Internationally, Eclipse entered the Top 40 album charts in five different countries.

Despite high chart positions it quickly descended from the charts within weeks. Eclipse was unable to match the success of Revelation, barely selling 100,000 copies—an 1/8th of the previous album's sales.

Eclipse received mixed to negative reviews. Rolling Stone reviewer Caryn Ganz rated the album at two stars, saying "Journey's second disc with Filipino YouTube discovery Arnel Pineda on vocals is both grand and distractingly proggy."  Stephen Thomas Erlewine of Allmusic also rated Eclipse at two stars, praising Journey's ability to fuse their prog-rock abilities with their arena rock sound; however, he goes on to say the album "pulsates with a certain insular chill that isn't especially welcoming; this is music made for the musicians, and if anybody else happens to like it, that's just a minor bonus."

Aftermath
Though Journey enjoyed the process of recording Eclipse, they considered its lack of success a career setback. They became skeptical of recording a new album, focusing primarily on live performances.  Jonathan Cain said "we have a great catalogue here, right now to play. We got a lot of songs that we're not even playing. So, we're like, 'What's the point of makin' a new CD right now?'".  Cain did not rule out the possibility of another album, which he says "I think we need to stay sort of closer to who we are, to who we've been -- great songs, great melodies, harmonies -- and not worry about if it's heavy or not. Our fans are getting older, man; they're not headbangers anymore. So if we do anything, I think we need to go back to the center."

Track listing

Personnel
Band members
Neal Schon – all guitars, backing vocals
Jonathan Cain – keyboards, backing vocals
Ross Valory – bass, backing vocals
Deen Castronovo – drums, percussion, backing vocals
Arnel Pineda – lead vocals

Production
Kevin Shirley – producer
Neal Schon, Jonathan Cain – co-producers
David Kalmusky – engineer, mixing, mastering
James McCullagh, Alberto Hernandez, Jesse Nichols – engineers
Casey Barker, Jason Hall, Brett Lind, Alex Dolphin – assistant engineers
Travis Shinn – photography

Charts 
 

Album

Songs

Release history

References

2011 albums
Journey (band) albums
Albums produced by Kevin Shirley
Frontiers Records albums
King Records (Japan) albums
Kakao M albums